Shepard Cliff is an isolated cliff, 4 miles (6 km) long, at the northeast margin of the Reeves Neve, in Victoria Land. Mapped by United States Geological Survey (USGS) from surveys and U.S. Navy aerial photographs, 1956–62. Named by Advisory Committee on Antarctic Names (US-ACAN) for Danny L. Shepard, U.S. Navy, construction electrician at South Pole Station in 1966.

Cliffs of Victoria Land
Scott Coast